The ZIL-112 Sports was a Soviet sports car made by ZIL car manufacturer in 1961 and competed in races from 1961 to 1969. Two cars were built. The ZIL-112S initiated a number of firsts for cars produced in the USSR such as controlled slip differential, disc brakes, radial-ply tires etc. A second ZIL-112S was equipped with a  7.0 L V8. Both engines were developed from the ZIS-110 engine. It could do 0–100 km/h in 9 seconds. Steering and front suspension came from the GAZ-21 Volga. In the rear, it used De Dion suspension with triangular levers. The transmission, like the engine, was from the ZIS-110.

In 1962, one ZIL-112S was rebuilt with a more aerodynamic body for an attempt at a Soviet land speed record. A second attempt was made at the Dmitrovsky race track, however winter weather made the attempt impossible.

Between 1963 and 1965 the car set five all-Union records in the racetracks. The  ZIL-112S, driven by Gennady Zharkov, won the USSR Championship in 1964 and 1965.

One ZIL-112S is in the Riga Motor Museum and the other is owned by a Swedish collector.

External links 
 ЗИЛ-112С

Sports racing cars
112
Soviet automobiles